Saraju Mohanty is an American professor of the Department of Computer Science and Engineering, and the director of the Smart Electronic Systems Laboratory, at the University of North Texas in Denton, Texas. Mohanty received a Glorious India Award – Rich and Famous NRIs of America in 2017 for his contributions to the discipline. Mohanty is a researcher in the areas of "consumer electronics for smart cities", "application-Specific things for efficient edge computing", and "methodologies for digital and mixed-signal hardware". He has made significant research contributions to security and IP protection of consumer electronic systems, hardware-assisted security and protection, high-level synthesis of digital signal processing (DSP) hardware, and mixed-signal integrated circuit computer-aided design and electronic design automation. Mohanty has been the editor-in-chief (EiC) of the IEEE Consumer Electronics Magazine since 2016. He has held the Chair of the IEEE Computer Society's Technical Committee on Very Large Scale Integration since September 2014. He holds 4 US patents in the areas of his research, and has published 220 research articles and 3 books.

Education 

Saraju Mohanty started his schooling at Lodhachua, Nayagarh, Odisha. After graduating from Badagada Government High School, Bhubaneswar in 1988, Mohanty completed a 10+2 Science degree from Rajdhani College, Bhubaneswar in 1990. He received his bachelor's degree in electrical engineering from the College of Engineering and Technology, Bhubaneswar, Orissa University of Agriculture and Technology, in 1995.

In 1999 Mohanty completed a master's degree in engineering in Systems Science and Automation from the Indian Institute of Science in Bangalore, India. His thesis mentors at IISc were Professor K. R. Ramakrishnan and Professor Mohan Kankanhalli (IEEE Fellow) with whom he co-authored his first peer-reviewed paper. Mohanty earned a PhD in computer engineering from the University of South Florida in 2003. His PhD mentor was Professor N. Ranganathan (IEEE Fellow and AAAS Fellow).

Scientific contributions

Contributions to security and IP protection of consumer electronic systems 

Mohanty has worked on the Secure Digital Camera (SDC) for real-time security and IP protection at the source end of the information. In the Internet of Things (IoT) framework the SDC can be a sensor node (aka thing) for real-time trustworthy sensing. The SDC can have applications where still image or video digital cameras are needed, such as secure digital video broadcasting, secure video surveillance, electronic passport, and identity card processing. The secure digital camera (SDC) has been adopted by various researchers worldwide.

Contributions to high-level synthesis of digital signal processing (DSP) hardware 

Mohanty has worked to high-level synthesis (HLS) or architecture-level synthesis of digital signal processing (DSP) hardware. His methods address energy consumption and power fluctuation in DSP hardware which are heart of consumer electronic systems such that battery life and battery efficiency increases. His nanoelectronic-based High-level synthesis techniques addresses the issue of process variations, the primary issue of nanoelectronic technology, during the high-level synthesis itself before the digital design moves to the detailed and lower levels of design abstractions, such as logic-level or transistor-level.

Contributions to analog electronics and mixed-signal circuits 

Mohanty has worked on design space exploration and optimization of analog/mixed-signal system on a chip (AMS-SoC) which is essentially the technology representation of a consumer electronics such as a smart mobile phone. The key feature of these design flows is the need for only two manual layout (or physical design) iterations which saves significant design effort. These fast design flows rely on accurate metamodels of the analog and mixed-signal circuit components. This research advances the state-of-the art in Design for Excellence (DfX) or Design for X, such as Design for Variability (DfV) and Design for Cost (DfC).

Selected editor and conference chair positions 

 Editor-in-chief of the IEEE Consumer electronics Magazine (MCE).
 Founding editor-in-chief of the VLSI Circuits and Systems Letter, IEEE-CS TCVLSI.
 Steering committee member, IEEE Transactions on Big Data (TBD), 2018—present.
 Associate editor, IEEE Transactions on Computer-Aided Design of Integrated Circuits and Systems (TCAD)
 Associate editor, ACM Journal on Emerging Technologies in Computing Systems (JETC)
 Associate editor, IEEE Transactions on Nanotechnology (TNANO)
 Associate editor, IET Circuits, Devices & Systems Journal (CDS)
 Steering Committee Chair, IEEE International Symposium on Nanoelectronic and Information Systems (iNIS)
 Steering Committee vice-chair, IEEE-CS Symposium on VLSI (ISVLSI)
 Steering Committee vice-chair, OITS International Conference on Information Technology (ICIT)
 General Chair, 36th IEEE International Conference on Consumer Electronics (ICCE), January 12–14, 2018, Las Vegas, USA.

Awards 
 Fulbright Specialist Award by U.S. Department of State's Bureau of Educational and Cultural Affairs and World Learning in 2020.
 IEEE Consumer Electronics Society Outstanding Service Award for 2019 for leadership contributions to the IEEE Consumer Electronics society.
 IEEE Consumer Electronics Society Chester Sall Award in 2020 for the Second place best paper in the IEEE Transactions on Consumer Electronics in 2018.
 The PROSE Award for best Textbook in Physical Sciences & Mathematics category from the Association of American Publishers (AAP) in 2016.
 The UNT Toulouse Scholars Award for outstanding scholarship and teaching achievements in 2016–2017.

References

External links 
Official Website

Living people
1973 births
University of North Texas faculty
University of South Florida alumni
Indian Institute of Science alumni
College of Engineering and Technology, Bhubaneswar alumni
American computer scientists
American academics of Indian descent
Computer engineers
Senior Members of the ACM
Senior Members of the IEEE
Scientists from Bhubaneswar